Escautpont is a commune in the Nord department in northern France.

Name
Escautpont is the bridge (pont in French) over the Escaut (Scheldt river).  Named in antiquity Scaldis Pons (same meaning in Latin) because there was, at this place, the only bridge on the Scheldt.

Heraldry

See also
Communes of the Nord department

References

Communes of Nord (French department)